Pasiphilodes rubrifusa is a moth in the family Geometridae. It is found on Peninsular Malaysia and Borneo.

References

Moths described in 1895
Eupitheciini